Paraskevas ( is a Greek male given name with the female equivalent being Paraskevi. Notable people with the name include:

 Paraskevas Andralas (born 1978), Greek association football player.
 Paraskevas Antzas (born 1977), Greece national team football player.
 Paraskevas Christou (born 1984), Cypriot national team football player.
 Paraskevas Sphicas, particle physicist

See also
 Paraskevas (surname), Greek surname.
 Paraskevopoulos, Greek surname ("son of Paraskevas")

Greek masculine given names